The Enticement is a 2022 Chinese streaming television series directed by Wen Chenglin, and starring Leon Jay Williams, Eva Huang and Yang Zi. The series entered production in Beijing in September 2012. It was aired on Sohu on July 28, 2022.

Plot
Before his death, Chen Tiannuo, president of the Tiannuo Group, gave two Dong Qichang paintings worth 200 million to Xia Wei, a descendant of the Xia family. At this time, Tiannuo Group faced a financial crisis and faced bankruptcy, forcing Chen Tiannuo's eldest son, Chen Jinyu, into a corner. Chen Jinyu thought that he wanted Xia Wei to marry his younger brother Chen Mingyu so that the Chen family would at least get part of the property, and the pure Xia Wei stepped into Chen Jinyu's trap step by step. In the process of Xia Wei and Chen Mingyu's contact, they finally fell in love, and at the same time, Xia Wei also discovered Chen Jinyu's conspiracy. Chen Mingyu can't face Xia Wei, and Xia Wei wakes up Mingyu with love. In the end, the lovers went through ups and downs and finally held hands and walked toward a new life together.

Cast

Main 
Leon Jay Williams as Chen Mingyu
Huang Shengyi as Xia Wei

Supporting 
Yang Zi as Chen Jinyu
Li Chenxi as Shi Cuihua
Sang Yehong
Liao Xueqiu
Li Qi as Hou Xingfu
Wang Chun as Pan Mei
Yang Yang as Hong Yu

See also
 List of Sohu original programming

References

External links

2022 Chinese television series debuts
2022 web series debuts
Chinese television series
Chinese drama television series
Chinese romance television series
Chinese web series
Mandarin-language television shows
Sohu original programming